In the 2013–14 season, JSM Béjaïa competed in the Ligue 1 for the 14th season, as well as the Algerian Cup. They competed in Ligue 1, and the Algerian Cup.

Pre-season and friendlies

Competitions

Overview

{| class="wikitable" style="text-align: center"
|-
!rowspan=2|Competition
!colspan=8|Record
!rowspan=2|Started round
!rowspan=2|Final position / round
!rowspan=2|First match	
!rowspan=2|Last match
|-
!
!
!
!
!
!
!
!
|-
| Ligue 1

|  
| style="background:#FFCCCC;"| 14th
| 24 August 2013
| 24 May 2014
|-
| Algerian Cup

| Round of 64 
| Round of 32
| 6 December 2013
| 20 December 2013
|-
! Total

Ligue 1

League table

Results summary

Results by round

Matches

Algerian Cup

Squad information

Playing statistics

|-
! colspan=10 style=background:#dcdcdc; text-align:center| Goalkeepers

|-
! colspan=10 style=background:#dcdcdc; text-align:center| Defenders

|-
! colspan=10 style=background:#dcdcdc; text-align:center| Midfielders

|-
! colspan=10 style=background:#dcdcdc; text-align:center| Forwards

|-
! colspan=10 style=background:#dcdcdc; text-align:center| Players transferred out during the season

Goalscorers

Transfers

In

Out

References

External links
 2013–14 JSM Béjaïa season at dzfoot.com 

JSM Béjaïa seasons
Algerian football clubs 2013–14 season